Jonathan Edwards "Jon" Ingersoll, Jr. is an American economist. He is the Adrian C. Israel Professor of International Trade and Finance at Yale School of Management. Prior to coming to Yale he was on the faculty at the Graduate School of Business at the University of Chicago.

Ingersoll's research area is finance, focusing on asset valuation—the pricing of options and futures and the term structure of interest rates. He is one of the authors of the Cox–Ingersoll–Ross model of the yield curve.

Ingersoll is a founding member of the Society for Financial Studies and has held editorial positions at several journals, including the Review of Financial Studies and the Journal of Finance. He was named Financial Engineer of the Year by the International Association of Financial Engineers in 2002.

He earned his SM (1973) and PhD (1976) from MIT Sloan and his SB in physics (1971) from MIT.

Bibliography

References

External links
 Jonathan E. Ingersoll's web page

1949 births
Living people
21st-century American economists
Financial economists
MIT Department of Physics alumni
Yale University faculty
MIT Sloan School of Management alumni